The Gravel Hills are a low mountain range in the central Mojave Desert, in northwestern San Bernardino County, California.

They are located northeast of Barstow, and northeast of Kramer Junction. A portion of the Gravel Hills are 
Bureau of Land Management property, but the majority of the land is privately owned.

References 

Mountain ranges of the Mojave Desert
Mountain ranges of San Bernardino County, California
Bureau of Land Management areas in California
Hills of California
Mountain ranges of Southern California